Ophiocordyceps camponoti-novogranadensis is a species of fungus that parasitizes insect hosts, in particular members of the order Hymenoptera.

Description
Its mycelium is a chocolate brown colour, and is especially dense around its feet, forming distinctive pads. Its stromatal morphology is the same as O. camponotirufipedis. Its fertile region is brown, its ascomata being semi-erumpent and crowded. The asci are 8-spored, hyaline and cylindrical, with a prominent apical cap, while the ascospores are hyaline, thin-walled, and 5–10-septate.

References

Further reading

Araújo, João, et al. "Unravelling the diversity behind Ophiocordyceps unilateralis complex: Three new species of Zombie-Ant fungus from Brazilian Amazon." bioRxiv (2014): 003806.

External links

MycoBank

Ophiocordycipitaceae
Fungi described in 2011